The Burn with Jeff Ross is a comedy panel show hosted by comedian Jeff Ross that aired on Comedy Central. The show debuted on August 14, 2012, and was executive produced by Ross himself. The program featured Ross roasting a wide variety of targets, along with guest appearances by fellow comedians who make up a panel of roasters. The show was renewed for a second season by Comedy Central, which premiered January 8, 2013.

Format 
The Burn with Jeff Ross was presented in a humorous half-hour format, and was broadcast Tuesday nights at 10:30 EST (9:30 Central). The show was broken down into many segments. Examples of these segments included celebrity visits, public roasting, and panelist roasting. The first season contained an additional segment, known as "speed roasting", in which members of the audience volunteered to be roasted. As of the second season, the "speed roasting" segment is available only via the Internet.

The show usually featured several segments such as:
 "Friendly Fire": Ross meets up with a celebrity friend of his, usually roasting each other
 "Rapid Fire": Ross makes a quick succession of jokes about a certain topic/celebrity (season 1 only)
 "Public Enemy": Ross, sometimes riding a Segway scooter, goes around to roast regular people out on the street, sometimes following a certain theme, such a meter maids and pornstars
 "Panel": three guest comedians discuss the recent news and pop culture happenings
 "Too Soon?": the last segment of every episode, Ross does a roast/eulogy for somebody that had recently died, whether a celebrity or someone anonymous who died in a humorous or idiotic way

Episodes

Season 1 (2012)

Season 2 (2013)

References

External links
 
 

2010s American comedy game shows
2012 American television series debuts
2013 American television series endings
Comedy Central original programming
English-language television shows
Roast (comedy)